In mathematics, a category is distributive if it has finite products and finite coproducts and such that for every choice of objects , the canonical map

 

is an isomorphism, and for all objects , the canonical map  is an isomorphism (where 0 denotes the initial object). Equivalently, if for every object  the endofunctor  defined by  preserves coproducts up to isomorphisms . It follows that  and aforementioned canonical maps are equal for each choice of objects. 

In particular, if the functor  has a right adjoint (i.e., if the category is cartesian closed), it necessarily preserves all colimits, and thus any cartesian closed category with finite coproducts (i.e., any bicartesian closed category) is distributive.

Example 

The category of sets is distributive. Then

where  denotes the coproduct in Set, namely the disjoint union, and  denotes a bijection.

The categories Grp and Ab are not distributive, even though they have both products and coproducts.

An even simpler category that has both products and coproducts but is not distributive is the category of pointed sets.

References

Further reading
 
 

Category theory